Ulverton is a municipality in Le Val-Saint-François Regional County Municipality in the Estrie region of Quebec, Canada.

Prior to December 15, 1999, it was in Drummond Regional County Municipality in the Centre-du-Québec region.

Demographics

Population

Language
Mother tongue (2011)

See also
List of municipalities in Quebec

References

External links

Municipalities in Quebec
Incorporated places in Estrie